Spinobrookula is an extinct genus of sea snails, marine gastropod mollusks in the family Skeneidae.

Species
 † Spinobrookula camiadeorum Lozouet & Maestrati, 1982

References

 Lozouet P. & Maestrati P. (1982). Nouvelles espèces de mollusques de l'Oligocène (Stampien) pour les bassins de Paris et d'Aquitaine. Archiv für Moluskenkunde. 112(1-6): 165–189.

Skeneidae
Gastropod genera